Eulepidotis albata is a moth of the family Erebidae first described by Felder and Rogenhofer in 1874. It is found in the Neotropical realm, including Brazil, French Guiana and Guyana.

References

Moths described in 1874
albata